Carol Joan Sutton (née Dickerson; December 3, 1944 – December 10, 2020) was an American actress of theater, film and television, best known for her appearances in the films Steel Magnolias, Monster's Ball, and Ray.

Biography
Carol Dickerson was born in New Orleans, Louisiana. She attended the Xavier University Preparatory School and then later enrolled at Xavier University of Louisiana, but dropped out of the latter after marrying Archie Sutton, whom she later divorced. She worked for Total Community Action and earned certification in early childhood development from Texas Southern University in Houston. She was also a parishioner at St Francis de Sales Catholic Church in New Orleans. Her brother Oris Buckner III was a New Orleans homicide detective who revealed widespread corruption and racism in the New Orleans police department.

Sutton died from complications of COVID-19 on December 10, 2020, seven days after her 76th birthday, amid the COVID-19 pandemic in New Orleans. She is interred at Mount Olivet Cemetery in New Orleans, Louisiana. The sixth episode of the second season of Outer Banks, titled "My Druthers", is dedicated in her memory.

Acting career 
She joined the Dashiki Project Theatre in the 1960s. Her acting debut came in the 1974 television film The Autobiography of Miss Jane Pittman. 

Sutton devoted much of her career to the theater and also served as an acting teacher in her hometown. She recorded a large number of supporting roles in American film and television, participating in productions such as The Pelican Brief, Candyman: Farewell to the Flesh, American Horror Story: Coven, True Detective, Kidnap, The Last Exorcism, Outer Banks and Killer Joe.

In 2012, Sutton received a New Orleans Lifetime Achievement Award.

In 2019, Sutton played Lena Younger in A Raisin in the Sun by Lorraine Hansberry.

Filmography

Film and television 

1974: The Autobiography of Miss Jane Pittman (TV Movie) as Vivian
1976: Sounder, Part 2
1976: Abejas asesinas (TV Movie) as Mrs. Compher
1977: Minstrel Man (TV Movie) as Tess
1978: Mirrors as Perfume Lady
1982: Cane River as Ms. Mathis
1984: Gimme a Break! (TV Series) as Stewardess (uncredited)
1986: The Big Easy as Judge
1987: A Gathering of Old Men (TV Movie) as Janey
1987: Uncle Tom's Cabin (TV Movie) as Lucy
1988: In the Heat of the Night (TV Series) as Macie Jones / Lucille Jeffson
1989: The Outside Woman (TV Movie) as Female Security Officer
1989: Steel Magnolias as Nurse Pam
1991: This Gun for Hire (TV Movie) as Guard
1991: Doublecrossed (TV Movie) as Bailiff #1
1991: Convicts as Lena
1993: The Fire Next Time (TV Mini Series) as Estelle
1993: The Pelican Brief as New Orleans Policewoman
1994: Heart of Stone as Judge
1995: Jake Lassiter: Justice on the Bayou (TV Movie) as Judge Hamill
1995: Candyman: Farewell to the Flesh as Angry Woman at Matthew's House
1996: The Big Easy (TV Series) as Judge
1997: Orleans (TV Series) as Mary
1997: Eve's Bayou as Madame Renard
1998: Rag and Bone (TV Movie) as Etta Parker
1999: A Lesson Before Dying (TV Movie) as Thelma
2001: Tempted as Steffie, LeBlanc's Maid
2001: Going to California (TV Series) as Gloria Stevens
2001: El pasado nos condena as Ms. Guillermo
2002: The Badge as Pharmacy Lady
2003: Runaway Jury as Lou Dell
2004: A Love Song for Bobby Long as Ruthie
2004: Ray as Eula
2004: The Dead Will Tell (TV Movie) as Bakery Owner
2004: The Madam's Family: The Truth About the Canal Street Brothel (TV Movie) as Ms. Aguillard
2004: Searching for David's Heart (TV Movie) as Records Administrator
2006: Glory Road as Old Woman - Cole Field House
2006: Deja Vu as Eyewitness / Survivor
2006: Nola as Bernice
2007: Quincy & Althea (Short) as Althea
2007: Flakes as Miss Lucille
2007: Pride as Ophelia (Andre's Mother)
2007: The Staircase Murders (TV Movie) as Jury Forewoman
2008: Welcome Home Roscoe Jenkins as Ms. Pearl
2008: American Violet as Charlise Leray
2008: Abduction of Jesse Bookman as Voodoo Lady
2008: The Loss of a Teardrop Diamond as Susie
2008: Front of the Class (TV Movie) as Admission Clerk
2009: Dixon's Girl (Short) as Clora
2009: In the Absence of Saints (Short) as Evelyn / Mother
2010: Father of Invention as Bingo Caller
2010: Beauty & the Briefcase (TV Movie) as Recruiter
2010: Treme (TV Series) as Melba
2010: The Last Exorcism as Shopkeeper
2010: Knucklehead as Woman on Bus
2011: Love, Wedding, Marriage as Matchmaker
2011: The Help as Cora
2011: Killer Joe as Saleslady
2011: Inside Out as Ancient Lady
2011: Jeff, Who Lives at Home as Elderly Woman
2012: Comando Especial as Hamilton Principal
2013: Robosapien: Rebooted as Mrs. Jacobs
2013: Red Bean Monday (Short) as Sally
2013: This Is the End as Cashier
2013: From the Rough as Esther Samsen
2013: White Rabbit as Librarian
2013: Oldboy as Vera
2013: American Horror Story: Coven (TV Series) as Black Woman
2014: True Detective (TV Series) as Miss Delores
2014: Elsa y Fred as Grocery Clerk
2014: Dawn of the Planet of the Apes as Old Woman
2014: American Heist as Hostage Woman
2014: Catch Hell as Delores
2014: Les maîtres du suspense as La Mambo
2015: Socialwerk (Short) as Miss Betty
2015: Bad Asses on the Bayou as Lois Morgan
2015: Hot Pursuit as Brenda
2015: N.O.L.A Circus as Psychiatrist
2015: Forgive and Forget as Catherine
2015: Scream Queens as Jury Foreman
2016: Confirmation (TV Movie) as Erma Hill
2016: Showing Roots as Rosadel
2016: Cold Moon as Nina
2016: Roots (TV Mini Series) as Miss Malizy
2016: Hidden America with Jonah Ray (TV Series) as Vanessa Watkins
2016: Abattoir as Muriel
2016: Scream (TV Series) as Drug Store Clerk
2016: Wild Oats as Mourner #4
2016: Plaquemines (Short) as Gam
2017: Camera Obscura as Dr. Vogel
2017: Kidnap as Nearby Woman #2
2017: Claws (TV Series) as Female Senior #1
2017: Things with Feathers (Short) as GoGo
2017: Sex Guaranteed as Old Lady
2017: Trailer Park Boys: Out of the Park (TV Series) as Witch Doctor
2018: Bad Stepmother (TV Movie) as Cara
2018: Out of Blue as Miss Tolkington
2019: Poms as Ruby
2019: The Last Laugh as Gayle Johnson
2019: Darlin' as Effie
2019: Mejor que nunca as Ruby
2019: Raceland (Short) as Paula
2019: Queen Sugar (TV Series) as Martha Lavoisier
2019: Hot Date (TV Series) as Angela
2019: Gothic Harvest as Erzuline
2019: Small Ball (Short) as Millie
2019: Greyson Family Christmas as Gran Hattie
2020: Messiah (TV Series) as Old Woman at Baptist Church
2020: Lovecraft Country (TV Series) as Ms. Osberta
2020: In the Bag (TV Series) as Angry Ol' Bat
2020: Freedom's Path as Caddy
2021: Outer Banks (TV Series) as Pope's Great Grandma

References

External links
 

1944 births
2020 deaths
20th-century American actresses
21st-century American actresses
Actresses from New Orleans
American stage actresses
American film actresses
American television actresses
African-American actresses
Deaths from the COVID-19 pandemic in Louisiana
Texas Southern University alumni
African-American Catholics
21st-century African-American people
21st-century African-American women